Plectreuridae, also called plectreurid spiders, is a small spider family confined to the Southwestern United States, Mexico, and the Caribbean. Only two living genera are known—the nominate genus Plectreurys and Kibramoa. In the past, the family was more widespread, with the Jurassic genus Eoplectreurys known from China, the Eocene Palaeoplectreurys baltica from Baltic amber and the Miocene Plectreurys pittfieldi from Dominican amber.

These ecribellate, haplogyne spiders build haphazard webs under rocks and dead cacti. Adult males can be found wandering at night. Relatively little is known of their biology. Unlike the sicariids, scytodids, and diguetids, to which they are most closely related, they have eight eyes. In appearance females of Plectreurys resemble those of the larger species of the cribellate Filistatidae. They differ in their eye arrangement and in having the femurs on the first pair of legs bowed. Also, in relativity to body size, they have the largest recognized venom glands, with their multilobular glands taking up up to 50% of their body.

Genera

, the World Spider Catalog accepts the following genera:

Kibramoa Chamberlin, 1924 — United States, Mexico
Plectreurys Simon, 1893 — North America, Cuba, Central America
†Eoplectreurys Selden & Huang, 2010
†Palaeoplectreurys Wunderlich, 2004

References

External links

 
Araneomorphae families
Extant Middle Jurassic first appearances